MFC may refer to:

Companies

 Manulife Financial Corporation, a Canadian multinational insurance company
 MyFreeCams, an American website providing live webcam performances by models

Computing
 Mel-frequency cepstrum, a representation of sounds used in applications such as automatic speech recognition
 Memory flow controller, a part of a computer architecture, e.g. in the Cell Broadband Engine
 Merged From Current, a term in a development model of FreeBSD
 Microsoft Foundation Class Library, a programming library for C++
 Michael F. Cowlishaw, a computer scientist with a 'difficult' surname and so widely known by his 'handle', mfc
 Multi-Function-Centre, a series of multifunction printers made by Brother Industries
 Multi Format Codec, an intellectual property core present within the Samsung Exynos SoCs to offer hardware accelerated encoding and decoding of video formats such as MPEG-2, MPEG-4, H.263, H.264, VC-1 and VP8
 Multicast forwarding cache, ip addresses and routes for IGMP and IGMP-proxy

Industry
 Mass flow controller, a device that controls gas flow
 Melamine faced chipboard, construction material usually used internally for shelving
 Micro fibrillated cellulose, a type of nanocellulose

Military

 Lockheed Martin Missiles and Fire Control, a business unit
Medical Forces Command, a specialist corps in the Ukrainian Armed Forces

Science
 Microbial fuel cell, a bio-electrochemical system that drives a current by mimicking bacterial interactions

Sports
M'lang F.C., an association football club from the Philippines
 Macarthur FC, an Australian association football club in the A-League
 Makati F.C., an association football youth club from the Philippines
 Maghull F.C., an English football club in the West Cheshire League Division One
 Magwe F.C., an association football club from Myanmar
 Manawmye F.C., an association football club from Myanmar
 Marine F.C., an English football club in the Northern Premier League Premier Division
 Maximum Fighting Championship, formerly Mixed Fighting Championship, a Canadian mixed martial arts promotion
 Melbourne Football Club, an Australian rules football club in the Australian Football League (AFL)
 Mendiola F.C. 1991, an association football club from the Philippines
 Meridian F.C., an English football club in the Kent Invicta League
 Middlesbrough F.C., an English football club in the Football League Championship
 Millwall F.C., an English professional football team in Football League Championship
 Montrose F.C., a Scottish semi-professional football team in the Scottish Football League
 Morecambe F.C., an English football club in Football League One
 Motherwell F.C., a Scottish professional football club in the Scottish Premier League

Other uses

 Machine finished coated paper, a type of coated paper that has a basis weight of 48–80 g/m2
 Manual fare collection in transport
 Marginal factor cost
 Master of Finance and Control, a course in finance run by the Department of Financial Studies of the University of Delhi
 "MFC" (song), a Pearl Jam song
 Music for Cars, an EP from The 1975

See also
 NFC (disambiguation)